Gaban may refer to:
 Gaban (novel), a 1931 Hindi novel by Munshi Premchand
 Gaban (film), a 1966 Hindi film adaptation of the novel

See also
 Space Sheriff Gavan, a Japanese Tokusatsu series, translated as Gaban in Indonesia and Malaysia